Natalia Maria Przybysz (born 1 September 1983 in Warsaw), also known as Natu or N'Talia, is a Polish rhythm and blues singer. She is a member of the Polish Society of the Phonographic Industry (Związek Producentów Audio Video, ZPAV).

Natalia Przybysz was one of the founding members of the popular Polish music group Sistars, together with her sister Paulina, from 2001 to 2006, briefly in 2011, and from 2012 to 2013. Since 2008, she has performed solo as Natu and recorded three studio albums. In 2013, after the final disbandment of Sistars, Natalia and Paulina Przybysz started a musical project called Archeo Sisters.

Career

Education and Sistars
Natalia Przybysz studied cello at a music school in Warsaw. She spent her final year of high school in the United States, in Iowa, and passed her Matura exams there.

In 2001, Natalia, her sister Paulina, and four other musicians started the Polish musical group Sistars, playing a mixture of R&B, soul, hip-hop and pop music. The band has released two number-one studio albums, Siła sióstr (2003) and A.E.I.O.U. (2005), and an extended play titled EP (2004), and became very popular in Poland. The group disbanded in 2006.

Solo career
In 2008, Natalia Przybysz adopted the pseudonym Natu, and released her debut studio album Maupka Comes Home, a collaboration with music producer Envee. It was followed by the release of her sophomore record Gram duszy in 2010.

In 2012, Natalia and Paulina Przybysz led one of the choirs in the second season of the Polish TV show Bitwa na głosy, broadcast by TVP 2. The same year, Sistars reunited and started working on material for a new record. However, the group broke up again in 2013, and the Przybysz sisters started a new musical project called Archeo Sisters. In June 2013 Natalia Przybysz also released her third album, Kozmic Blues: Tribute to Janis Joplin, containing covers of Janis Joplin songs and one original composition, "Niebieski".

She released her latest album, Prąd, on 17 November 2014 on the Warner Music Poland label.

Personal life
Natalia Przybysz has two children, daughter Aniela (born January 2010) and son Jeremi (born June 2012). She is a vegan.

In October 2016, she admitted she had had an abortion a year before, leading to public criticism in Poland.

Discography

Studio albums

Music videos

References

Musicians from Warsaw
1983 births
Living people
Mystic Production artists
Polish soul singers
Polish hip hop singers
Women hip hop musicians
Polish pop singers
English-language singers from Poland
Polish lyricists
21st-century Polish singers
21st-century Polish women singers